Kontemenos is a town located in the Kyrenia District of Cyprus, 7 km northwest of Skylloura. It is under the de facto control of Northern Cyprus.

Since the Turkish invasion in 1974, the village has been used as a Turkish military camp. The etymology of the village's name is unclear. Until 1974, Turkish Cypriots called the village "Kördemen" or "Kördümen" ("blind wheel"); this name was changed after 1974 and the village was named after Seçim Kılıçaslan, a Turkish soldier who died near the village during the invasion.

References

Communities in Kyrenia District
Populated places in Girne District
Greek Cypriot villages depopulated during the 1974 Turkish invasion of Cyprus